Cho Keung-Yeon (born on March 18, 1961) is a former South Korea football player. he was top scorer of K-League in 1989.

Honors and awards

Player
POSCO Atoms
 K-League Winners (1) : 1988

Individual
 K-League Regular Season Top Scorer Award (1): 1989
 K-League Best XI (1) : 1989

External links
 

1961 births
Living people
Association football forwards
South Korean footballers
South Korea international footballers
K League 1 players
Pohang Steelers players
Ulsan Hyundai FC players
Expatriate football managers in China
Yanbian Funde F.C. managers
South Korean football managers
Pungyang Jo clan